The 2001 NFL Draft was the 66th annual meeting of National Football League (NFL) franchises to select newly eligible professional football players. The draft, which is officially referred to as the "NFL Player Selection Meeting," was held at the Theater at Madison Square Garden in New York City, New York on April 21–22, 2001.

Each team is assigned one pick per round with the order based generally on the reverse order of finish in the previous season with the team with the worst record receiving the first draft slot. Exceptions to this are the Super Bowl participants from the previous season — the champion Baltimore Ravens were assigned the final draft slot and the runner-up New York Giants assigned the 30th slot in each round. The draft was broadcast on ESPN and ESPN2. Due to previous trades, the Dallas Cowboys and Tennessee Titans did not have selections in the first round. More than half of the players selected in the draft's first round (17 of 31) would eventually be elected to at least one Pro Bowl.

The first player selected in the draft was quarterback Michael Vick from Virginia Tech, who was selected by the Atlanta Falcons after they acquired the first pick in a trade with the San Diego Chargers. Vick spent six seasons with the Falcons before being sentenced to 21 months in prison for his involvement in an illegal interstate dog fighting ring, eventually rebounding his career with the Philadelphia Eagles after being released from prison and winning the NFL's Comeback Player of the Year Award in 2010.

Florida State quarterback Chris Weinke, the 2000 winner of the Heisman Trophy, awarded to the player deemed most outstanding in college football, was selected in the fourth round by the Carolina Panthers. After being a regular starter for the Panthers in his first season, during which Carolina posted a 1–15 record, Weinke played only 12 games over his final five seasons before being released. The last player selected, who traditionally receives the unofficial title Mr. Irrelevant, was Tevita Ofahengaue of Brigham Young University, who was chosen by the Arizona Cardinals. Ofahengaue never played in the NFL, and in 2011 was charged with stealing gasoline from a construction company in Salt Lake City. He is currently the Player Personnel Director at BYU.

There were 31 compensatory selections distributed among 16 teams during rounds three through seven, with the Jacksonville Jaguars and Buffalo Bills receiving 4 picks each. The University of Miami was the college with the most players selected in the first round, with Dan Morgan, Damione Lewis, Santana Moss and Reggie Wayne all picked at that stage. Across the whole draft, however, Florida State University had the most players selected, a total of nine compared to Miami's seven.

No teams elected to claim any players in the 2001 supplemental draft.

The last remaining active player from this draft was Drew Brees, who was drafted 32nd overall by the San Diego Chargers, and went on to win Super Bowl XLIV as a member of the New Orleans Saints, with whom he had played from the 2006 season until his retirement in 2021.

Player selections

Trades
In the explanations below, (D) denotes trades that took place during the draft, while (PD) indicates trades completed pre-draft.

Round one

Round two

Round three

Round four

Round five

Round six

Round seven

Players by position
The 246 players chosen in the draft were composed of:

Notable undrafted players

Hall of Famers

 LaDainian Tomlinson, running back from TCU, taken 1st round 5th overall by the San Diego Chargers.
Inducted: Professional Football Hall of Fame Class of 2017.
 Steve Hutchinson, guard from Michigan, taken 1st round 17th overall by the Seattle Seahawks.
Inducted: Professional Football Hall of Fame Class of 2020.
 Richard Seymour, defensive tackle from Georgia, taken 1st round 6th overall by the New England Patriots.
Inducted: Professional Football Hall of Fame Class of 2022.

References
General references

 

Trade references

Specific references

National Football League Draft
NFL Draft
Draft
Madison Square Garden
NFL Draft
NFL Draft
American football in New York City
2000s in Manhattan
Sporting events in New York City